
Year 271 BC was a year of the pre-Julian Roman calendar. At the time it was known as the Year of the Consulship of Claudus and Clepsina (or, less frequently, year 483 Ab urbe condita). The denomination 271 BC for this year has been used since the early medieval period, when the Anno Domini calendar era became the prevalent method in Europe for naming years.

Events 
 By place 
 Greece 
 With the restoration of the territories captured by Pyrrhus, and with grateful allies in Sparta and Argos, and garrisons in Corinth and other Greek key cities, Antigonus II securely controls Macedonia and the other states of Greece. Antigonus becomes the chief of the Thessalian League and is on good terms with neighbouring Illyria and Thrace. He secures his position in central and south Greece by keeping Macedonian occupation forces in the cities of Corinth, Chalcis on the island of Euboea, and Demetrias in Thessaly, the three "shackles" of Hellas.

 India 
 The Mauryan army is driven out of Kadamba by a coalition of Tamil kings under Emperor Cenni Cholan.

Births 
 Aratus of Sicyon, Greek general (strategos) and statesman (d. 213 BC)

Deaths

References